Prepared for the Worst: Selected Essays and Minority Reports is a 1998 collection of essays by the author Christopher Hitchens that first appeared in British and American publications. These include Harpers, Times Literary Supplement, The Spectator, London Review of Books, The Nation, New Statesman and Society. The collection includes sections devoted to literary criticism, foreign reportage and political analysis.

References

External links
 Library of Congress records

1988 non-fiction books
Books by Christopher Hitchens
Political books
Essay collections
Books of literary criticism